HMS Swiftsure was a 70-gun third-rate ship of the line of the Royal Navy, launched in 1755 and in active service during the Seven Years' War. After a distinguished career at sea she  was decommissioned in 1763 and sold into private hands ten years later.

Construction
Swiftsure was built at Deptford Dockyard to the specifications of  the 1745 Establishment, and launched on 25 May 1750.

Naval service
Swiftsure was commissioned into the Royal Navy in August 1755, under Captain Augustus Keppel. In 1756 her command was transferred to Captain Matthew Buckle, and she was assigned first to the fleet under Admiral Henry Osborn, and then to that of Edward Boscawen. In company with  she engaged and captured the French ship of the line  in 1758, and towed her to join the fleet of Admiral Osborn at Cartagena.

In 1759 she was again with Admiral Boscawen at Lagos, and at Quiberon Bay later that year, and at the capture of Belle Île in 1761.

She was sold on 2 June 1773.

References

Bibliography
 
 Lavery, Brian (2003) The Ship of the Line – Volume 1: The development of the battlefleet 1650–1850. Conway Maritime Press. .
 

 

Ships of the line of the Royal Navy
1750 ships
Ships built in Deptford